Brent Harvey (born 14 May 1978), often known by his nickname "Boomer", is a former Australian rules footballer who played for the North Melbourne Football Club in the Australian Football League (AFL). He holds the record for most matches played by an individual in VFL/AFL history, breaking Michael Tuck's previous VFL/AFL record in 2016 with a total of 432 games played.

Career
Drafted by the North Melbourne Football Club in the third round of the 1995 AFL Draft, Harvey played in his only premiership side in 1999 after earning an E. J. Whitten Medal for being judged as the best player afield playing Victoria in the State of Origin series; it was the last time this medal was awarded, as the State of Origin series was put on indefinite hiatus at the end of the year. He won the Syd Barker Medal in 2003 as well as the Jim Stynes Medal in the International rules series, captaining the Australian team in the 2008 International Rules Series.

A highlight of his 2003 season was against Carlton at the Telstra Dome in Round 22. Playing in his 150th game, Harvey kicked three goals in the Roos' record-breaking 124-point victory.

He was the only North Melbourne player to have played every game at Manuka Oval during North Melbourne's nine-year stint at the venue.

In 2007, Harvey polled 22 votes in the Brownlow Medal, finishing equal second, and in 2008 Harvey polled 17 votes to finish in eighth place despite being one of the favourites to win the award in both years.

In 2010, the week after a career-low five-possession game against St Kilda, Harvey led North Melbourne to a 25-point win over West Coast Eagles with a career-best 44 disposals, along with 11 marks, six goal-scoring assists, and one goal. Harvey also almost kicked a candidate for goal of the year, taking seven bounces of the ball in a run from defence before hitting the post with his shot at goal. Incidentally, Harvey holds the record for most career bounces, with 1,055. He is the only player to have crossed the thousand-bounce threshold. In 2011, playing his 312th game, he broke Glenn Archer's all-time club record for games played.

Harvey's grandfather Bill Harvey played two games for North Melbourne in 1948. His brother, Shane Harvey, played 14 games for Essendon and North Melbourne from 2002 to 2004.

Late career
In Round 17 of the 2015 AFL season, Harvey played his 400th career game, becoming the first North Melbourne player to do so and fourth overall. He kicked two goals in a performance that suggested his career was far from over.

In Round 19 of the 2016 AFL season, Harvey broke Michael Tuck's record for most VFL/AFL matches by a player. In honor of Tuck's record, the Kangaroos wore the number 427 applied to the vertical royal-blue bars of their guernseys, and the number 50 on the 50-metre arc was replaced by 29, the number Harvey had worn for his entire AFL career. In August, North Melbourne announced they would not renew his contract for the 2017 season.

On Friday 7 October 2016 at the 2016 Syd Barker Medal night, Brent Harvey announced his retirement from AFL football. He was the last-remaining VFL/AFL player born in the 1970s, and the last who had played in the 1990s.

In 2022, he was inducted into the AFL Hall Of Fame in his first year of eligibility. At the time of the announcement, he remained the AFL/VFL all-time leader in games played, with 432, with only four others achieving the feat: Tuck, Essendon's Dustin Fletcher, Richmond's Kevin Bartlett, and Port Adelaide and Hawthorn's Shaun Burgoyne.

In elite Australian rules football (the VFL/AFL, SANFL and WAFL), Harvey is ranked third for most career premiership matches (home-and-away and finals matches) played, behind Craig Bradley (464, including 89 SANFL matches for Port Adelaide) and Burgoyne (433, including 26 SANFL matches for Port Adelaide) as of 2022.

Other matches
Harvey also played two matches for Victoria in State of Origin football, and 46 matches in pre-season/night series competition for North Melbourne (which are counted as senior in the SANFL and WAFL but not the VFL/AFL). If these are included, Harvey played a total of 480 career senior matches. 

The AFL record Harvey's total as 445 career senior games, excluding his pre-season/night series matches but including 11 International Rules matches, which are counted as senior by the AFL. If his pre-season/night series matches are included here, Harvey played an overall total of 491 senior career matches.

Depending on the viewpoint taken, Harvey broke Tuck's elite Victorian football record in Round 16 of 2016 (using the AFL's total), in Round 10 of 2016 (excluding International rules matches), or in the first pre-season round of 2016 (including International Rules matches).

As of 2022, Harvey's career total of 445 senior career matches (using the AFL's total) ranks fifth, behind Bradley (501), Peter Carey (467), Greg Phillips (447) and Russell Ebert (446), while if his pre-season/night series matches are included, Harvey's career total of 480 or 491 senior matches (depending on whether or not his International Rules matches are excluded) ranks second behind Bradley (519 or 528).

Statistics

|- style="background-color: #EAEAEA"
! scope="row" style="text-align:center" | 1996
| style="text-align:center;" | 
| 29 || 1 || 0 || 0 || 0 || 1 || 1 || 0 || 0 || 0.0 || 0.0 || 0.0 || 1.0 || 1.0 || 0.0 || 0.0
|-
! scope="row" style="text-align:center" | 1997
| style="text-align:center;" | 
| 29 || 17 || 10 || 8 || 105 || 54 || 159 || 26 || 9 || 0.6 || 0.5 || 6.2 || 3.2 || 9.4 || 1.5 || 0.5
|- style="background-color: #EAEAEA"
! scope="row" style="text-align:center" | 1998
| style="text-align:center;" | 
| 29 || 23 || 32 || 20 || 209 || 89 || 298 || 44 || 31 || 1.4 || 0.9 || 9.1 || 3.9 || 13.0 || 1.9 || 1.3
|-
! scope="row" style="text-align:center" | 1999
| style="text-align:center;" | 
| 29 || 23 || 24 || 14 || 273 || 112 || 385 || 66 || 28 || 1.0 || 0.6 || 11.9 || 4.9 || 16.7 || 2.9 || 1.2
|- style="background-color: #EAEAEA"
! scope="row" style="text-align:center" | 2000
| style="text-align:center;" | 
| 29 || 25 || 35 || 32 || 375 || 160 || 535 || 107 || 50 || 1.4 || 1.3 || 15.0 || 6.4 || 21.4 || 4.3 || 2.0
|-
! scope="row" style="text-align:center" | 2001
| style="text-align:center;" | 
| 29 || 20 || 17 || 19 || 338 || 172 || 510 || 75 || 29 || 0.9 || 1.0 || 16.9 || 8.6 || 25.5 || 3.8 || 1.5
|- style="background-color: #EAEAEA"
! scope="row" style="text-align:center" | 2002
| style="text-align:center;" | 
| 29 || 20 || 30 || 12 || 296 || 133 || 429 || 65 || 45 || 1.5 || 0.6 || 14.8 || 6.7 || 21.5 || 3.3 || 2.3
|-
! scope="row" style="text-align:center" | 2003
| style="text-align:center;" | 
| 29 || 21 || 28 || 20 || 314 || 137 || 451 || 94 || 38 || 1.3 || 1.0 || 15.0 || 6.5 || 21.5 || 4.5 || 1.8
|- style="background-color: #EAEAEA"
! scope="row" style="text-align:center" | 2004
| style="text-align:center;" | 
| 29 || 21 || 30 || 13 || 218 || 117 || 335 || 71 || 37 || 1.4 || 0.6 || 10.4 || 5.6 || 16.0 || 3.4 || 1.8
|-
! scope="row" style="text-align:center" | 2005
| style="text-align:center;" | 
| 29 || 23 || 23 || 17 || 325 || 188 || 513 || 108 || 49 || 1.0 || 0.7 || 14.1 || 8.2 || 22.3 || 4.7 || 2.1
|- style="background-color: #EAEAEA"
! scope="row" style="text-align:center" | 2006
| style="text-align:center;" | 
| 29 || 22 || 17 || 11 || 335 || 195 || 530 || 121 || 46 || 0.8 || 0.5 || 15.2 || 8.9 || 24.1 || 5.5 || 2.1
|-
! scope="row" style="text-align:center" | 2007
| style="text-align:center;" | 
| 29 || 25 || 36 || 17 || 351 || 243 || 594 || 116 || 53 || 1.4 || 0.7 || 14.0 || 9.7 || 23.8 || 4.6 || 2.1
|- style="background-color: #EAEAEA"
! scope="row" style="text-align:center" | 2008
| style="text-align:center;" | 
| 29 || 23 || 25 || 19 || 339 || 230 || 569 || 110 || 54 || 1.1 || 0.8 || 14.7 || 10.0 || 24.7 || 4.8 || 2.3
|-
! scope="row" style="text-align:center" | 2009
| style="text-align:center;" | 
| 29 || 15 || 12 || 8 || 193 || 142 || 335 || 62 || 31 || 0.8 || 0.5 || 12.9 || 9.5 || 22.3 || 4.1 || 2.1
|- style="background-color: #EAEAEA"
! scope="row" style="text-align:center" | 2010
| style="text-align:center;" | 
| 29 || 22 || 25 || 22 || 313 || 234 || 547 || 92 || 63 || 1.1 || 1.0 || 14.2 || 10.6 || 24.9 || 4.2 || 2.9
|-
! scope="row" style="text-align:center" | 2011
| style="text-align:center;" | 
| 29 || 22 || 31 || 25 || 304 || 188 || 492 || 80 || 59 || 1.4 || 1.1 || 13.8 || 8.5 || 22.4 || 3.6 || 2.7
|- style="background-color: #EAEAEA"
! scope="row" style="text-align:center" | 2012
| style="text-align:center;" | 
| 29 || 23 || 35 || 9 || 285 || 235 || 520 || 99 || 47 || 1.5 || 0.4 || 12.4 || 10.2 || 22.6 || 4.3 || 2.0
|-
! scope="row" style="text-align:center" | 2013
| style="text-align:center;" | 
| 29 || 16 || 19 || 9 || 210 || 175 || 385 || 75 || 43 || 1.2 || 0.6 || 13.1 || 10.9 || 24.1 || 4.7 || 2.7
|- style="background-color: #EAEAEA"
! scope="row" style="text-align:center" | 2014
| style="text-align:center;" | 
| 29 || 22 || 29 || 20 || 310 || 249 || 559 || 106 || 66 || 1.3 || 0.9 || 14.1 || 11.3 || 25.4 || 4.8 || 3.0
|-
! scope="row" style="text-align:center" | 2015
| style="text-align:center;" | 
| 29 || 25 || 24 || 15 || 304 || 266 || 570 || 74 || 53 || 1.0 || 0.6 || 12.2 || 10.6 || 22.8 || 3.0 || 2.1
|- style="background-color: #EAEAEA"
! scope="row" style="text-align:center" | 2016
| style="text-align:center;" | 
| 29 || 23 || 36 || 24 || 290 || 206 || 496 || 98 || 56 || 1.6 || 0.7 || 12.6 || 9.0 || 21.6 || 4.3 || 2.4
|- class="sortbottom"
! colspan=3 | Career
! 432
! 518
! 334
! 5687
! 3526
! 9213
! 1689
! 887
! 1.2
! 0.7
! 13.1
! 8.1
! 21.3
! 3.9
! 2.0
|}

Honours and achievements

 Team
 AFL Premiership: 1999
 McClelland Trophy: 1998
 NAB Cup: 1998
 AFL Reserves Premiership: 1996
 Individual
 E. J. Whitten Medal: 1999
 Syd Barker Medal: 2003, 2005, 2007, 2008, 2010 (tied with Brady Rawlings)
 All-Australian: 2000, 2005, 2007, 2008
 Australian Representative Honours in International Rules Football: 2000, 2001, 2003, 2005, 2008 (C)
 Jim Stynes Medal: 2003
 Lou Richards Medal: 2007, 2008
 Herald Sun Player of the Year: 2008
 Archer–Hird Medal: 2009, 2011
 North Melbourne F.C. Team of the Century
 AFL Hall Of Fame (2022 Class)
 '''Most senior AFL games: 432

See also
 List of VFL/AFL players to have played 300 games
 List of VFL/AFL records

References

External links

 
 
 Footywire profile

1978 births
Living people
North Melbourne Football Club players
North Melbourne Football Club Premiership players
Syd Barker Medal winners
All-Australians (AFL)
Victorian State of Origin players
Australian rules footballers from Melbourne
Northern Knights players
E. J. Whitten Medal winners
Australia international rules football team players
One-time VFL/AFL Premiership players
People from Preston, Victoria